The 2013 Japanese Grand Prix (formally known as the 2013 Formula 1 Japanese Grand Prix) was a Formula One motor race that was held on 13 October 2013 at the Suzuka Circuit in Suzuka, Japan. The race was the fifteenth round of the 2013 season, and marked the 39th running of the Japanese Grand Prix. The race, contested over 53 laps, was won by Sebastian Vettel, driving a Red Bull after starting from second on the grid. Mark Webber, who started on pole position, settled for second after being forced to switch to a three stop strategy, which in the end was not successful. 
Romain Grosjean took his second podium in succession in third position for Lotus F1. This was Red Bull's 14th one-two finish in Formula One.

The result meant that the title was not sealed at Suzuka but Vettel could seal it with 5th place at the next race in India. Meanwhile, Fernando Alonso stretched his lead to 30 points over Kimi Räikkönen but was still 90 behind Vettel's total.
Räikkönen in turn also increased his lead over Lewis Hamilton to 16 points after the Briton retired from puncture damage after colliding with Vettel on lap one. The result also meant that only Alonso could deprive Vettel of becoming world champion as Hamilton and Räikkönen fell out of contention.

Report

Background
Tyre supplier Pirelli brought its Orange-banded hard compound tyre as the harder "prime" tyre and the White-banded Medium compound tyre as the softer "option" tyre, as opposed to the previous year where hard and soft selection were provided. Jules Bianchi and Charles Pic were each given ten-place grid penalties after stewards found they had been speeding behind the safety car at the previous round in Korea. Both drivers were reprimanded for their actions, and automatically received a ten-place grid penalty as it was their third reprimand of the season.

Free Practice
Free Practice 1 saw Heikki Kovalainen drive for Caterham, in place of Charles Pic. The session was not without incident, as both Jules Bianchi (Marussia), Giedo van der Garde (Caterham) both went off at the exit of the second Degner corner. As a result of his accident, Bianchi was forced to sit out of Free Practice 2, while his car was repaired. Pastor Maldonado suffered a loose wheel up at Spoon Curve. Williams were later fined €60,000 for failing to attach the wheel properly. Lewis Hamilton set the fastest lap of the session, with teammate Nico Rosberg behind him.

Free Practice 2 saw Pastor Maldonado also going off at the second Degner corner, where he became stuck in the gravel. Sergio Pérez lost control of his McLaren going into Spoon, and slid backwards and made heavy contact with the tyre barrier. Fernando Alonso spun at the second Degner corner, but he was able to continue. Kimi Räikkönen spun into the gravel trap at the Dunlop corner and was forced to end his session. This time championship leader Sebastian Vettel finished the session fastest, with teammate Mark Webber behind him.

Qualifying
In a first, Charles Pic was given a drive-through penalty for leaving the pits when the red light was displayed at the pit exit during qualifying. The penalty was to be served during the first five laps of the race.

Race 
At the start, Romain Grosjean made a superb start to lead into the first corner, behind him there was drama with Mark Webber making contact with Lewis Hamilton causing the latter to have a puncture, also there was a collision between the Marussia of Jules Bianchi and the Caterham of Giedo van der Garde sending both cars into the barriers at the first corner, fortunately both cars were removed quickly so no safety car was needed. Hamilton pitted to change his punctured tyre but retired on lap 7 with floor damage. Grosjean led until the pit stops but careful tyre management from Sebastian Vettel during the second phase of the race meant he was able to pass Grosjean and go on to win the race. On the penultimate lap Webber then caught and passed Grosjean to make it a Red Bull 1-2, with Grosjean having to settle for 3rd. Fernando Alonso claimed 4th with Nico Hülkenberg in fifth. Kimi Raikkionen managed 6th although he was some 40 seconds behind his teammate Grosjean. Esteban Gutierrez had the strongest race of his career with 7th beating Nico Rosberg who had to serve a drive through penalty for an unsafe release in the pits.

Classification

Qualifying

Notes:
 — Adrian Sutil received a five-place grid penalty for a gearbox change. However, he chose he demoted two-five places for causing a deliberate accident at the previous race. 
 — Charles Pic and Jules Bianchi received ten-place grid penalties for receiving three reprimands over the season. However, due to Sutil's grid penalty Pic and Bianchi were promoted to 20th and 21st respectively.

Race

Championship standings after the race

Drivers' Championship standings

Constructors' Championship standings

 Note: Only the top five positions are included for both sets of standings.
 Bold text shows drivers or teams that still had a mathematical chance of winning the championship.

References

External links

Japanese
Grand Prix
Japanese Grand Prix
Japanese Grand Prix